The South Asian Stone Age covers the Palaeolithic, Mesolithic and Neolithic periods in South Asia. Evidence for the most ancient Homo sapiens in South Asia has been found in the cave sites of Cudappah of India, Batadombalena and Belilena in Sri Lanka. In Mehrgarh, in what is today western Pakistan, the Neolithic began c. 7000 BCE and lasted until 3300 BCE and the first beginnings of the Bronze Age. In South India, the Mesolithic lasted until 3000 BCE, and the Neolithic until 1400 BCE, followed by a Megalithic transitional period mostly skipping the Bronze Age. The Iron Age began roughly simultaneously in North and South India, around c. 1200 to 1000 BCE (Painted Grey Ware culture, Hallur, Paiyampalli).

Homo erectus

Homo erectus lived on the Pothohar Plateau, in upper Punjab, Pakistan along the Soan River (nearby modern-day Rawalpindi) during the Pleistocene Epoch. Soanian sites are found in the Sivalik region across what are now India, Pakistan and Nepal. Biface handaxes and cleaver traditions may have originated in the middle Pleistocene. The beginning of the use of Acheulian and chopping tools of the lower Paleolithic may also be dated to approximately the middle Pleistocene.

Neolithic Stone Age of Indian subcontinent (7000 BCE - 5500 BCE) finds were excavated from Pinjore in Haryana on the banks of the stream (paleochannel of Saraswati river) flowing through HMT complex, by Guy Ellcock Pilgrim who was a British geologist and palaeontologist, who discovered 1.5 million years (15 lakhs) old prehistoric human teeth and part of a jaw denoting that the ancient people, who were intelligent hominins dating as far back as 1,500,000 ybp Acheulean period, lived in Pinjore region near Chandigarh. Quartzite tools of lower Paleolithic period were excavated in this region extending from Pinjore in Haryana to Nalagarh (Solan district) in Himachal Pradesh.

The coming of Homo sapiens

Analysis of mitochondrial DNA dates the immigration of Homo sapiens to South Asia to 75,000 to 50,000 years ago. Cave sites in Sri Lanka have yielded the earliest non-mitochondrial record of Homo sapiens in South Asia. They were dated to 34,000 years ago. (Kennedy 2000: 180). For finds from the Belan in southern Uttar Pradesh, India radiocarbon data have indicated an age of 18,000-17,000 years.

At the Rock Shelters of Bhimbetka humans lived throughout the Upper Paleolithic (10th to 8th millennia BCE), revealing cave paintings dating to c. 30,000 BCE, and there are small cup like depressions at the end of the Auditorium Rock Shelter, which is dated to nearly 100,000 years;  the Sivaliks and the Potwar (Pakistan) region also exhibit many vertebrate fossil remains and paleolithic tools. Chert, jasper and quartzite were often used by humans during this period.

Neolithic

The aceramic Neolithic (Mehrgarh I, Baluchistan, Pakistan, also dubbed "Early Food Producing Era") lasts c. 7000 - 5500 BCE. The ceramic Neolithic lasts up to 3300 BCE, blending into the Early Harappan (Chalcolithic to Early Bronze Age) period. One of the earliest Neolithic sites in India is Lahuradewa in the Middle Ganges region and Jhusi near the confluence of Ganges and Yamuna rivers, both dating to around the 7th millennium BCE. Recently another site along the ancient Saraswati riverine system in the present day state of Haryana in India called Bhirrana has been discovered yielding a dating of around 7600 BCE for its Neolithic levels.

In South India the Neolithic began by 3000 BCE and lasted until around 1400 BCE. South Indian Neolithic is characterized by Ashmounds since 2500 BCE in the Andhra-Karnataka region that expanded later into Tamil Nadu. Comparative excavations carried out in Adichanallur in the Thirunelveli District and in Northern India have provided evidence of a southward migration of the Megalithic culture. The earliest clear evidence of the presence of the megalithic urn burials are those dating from around 1000 BCE, which have been discovered at various places in Tamil Nadu, notably at Adichanallur, 24 kilometers from Tirunelveli, where archaeologists from the Archaeological Survey of India unearthed 12 urns containing human skulls, skeletons and bones, husks, grains of charred rice and Neolithic celts, confirming the presence of the Neolithic period 2800 years ago. Archaeologists have made plans to return to Adhichanallur as a source of new knowledge in the future.

See also 
 History of Afghanistan
 History of Bangladesh
 History of Bhutan
 History of India
 History of Maldives
 History of Nepal
 History of Pakistan
 History of Sri Lanka
 Prehistoric Asia

Notes

References 

 
 
 
Biagi P,  Kazi M M e Negrino F. 1996. An Acheulian  workshop at Ziarat Pir Shaban on the Rohri Hills (Sindh - Pakistan). South Asian Studies, 12: 49–62. Cambridge.
Biagi P, Kazi M.M, Madella M e Ottomano C. 1998-2000 - Excavations at the Late  Palaeolithic site  of ZPS2 in the Rohri  Hills, Sindh, Pakistan. Origini, XXII: 111–133. Roma.
Biagi P. 2003-2004 - The Mesolithic Settlement of Sindh (Pakistan): A Preliminary Assessment. Praehistoria, 4-5: 195–220. Miskolc.
Biagi P. 2011 - Late (Upper) Palaeolithic Sites at Jhimpir in Lower Sindh (Pakistan). In Taskiran H., Kartal M., Özcelik K., Kösem M.B. and Kartal G. (eds.) Iş?n Yalç?nkaya'ya Armagan. Ankara University, Ankara: 67–84.
Biagi P. and Nisbet R. 2011 - The Palaeolithic sites at Ongar in Sindh, Pakistan: a precious archaeological resource in danger. Antiquity Project Gallery. Antiquity 85 (329): 1–6. August 2011. http://www.antiquity.ac.uk/projgall/biagi329/. Cambridge.
P. Biagi and E. Starnini 2014 - The Levallois Mousterian assemblages of Sindh (Pakistan) and their relations with the Middle Palaeolithic in the Indian Subcontinent. Archaeology, Ethnology & Anthropology of Eurasia, 42 (1): 18-32 (Elsevier English edition). Doi: 10.1016/j.aeae.2014.10.002.
P. Biagi 2015 - Modeling the Past: The Paleoethnological Evidence. In W. Henke, I Tattersall (eds) Handbook of Paleoanthropology. Springer Verlag, Berlin-Heidelberg (2nd revised Edition): 817-843 Doi: 10.1007/978-3-642-27800-6_24-3.
P. Biagi 2017 - Why so many different stones? The Late (Upper) Palaeolithic of Sindh reconsidered. Journal of Asian Civilizations, 40 (1): 1-40.
P. Biagi and E. Starnini E. 2018 - Neanderthals and Modern Humans in the Indus Valley? The Middle and Late (Upper) Palaeolithic Settlement of Sindh, a Forgotten Region of the Indian Subcontinent. In: Nishiaki Y. and Akazawa T. (eds.) The Middle and Upper Paleolithic Archeology of the Levant and Beyond. Replacement of Neanderthals by Modern Humans Series. Springer, Singapore: 175–197. doi:10.1007/978-981-10-6826-3_12.

External links
 Modern Humans Arrival In South Asia May Have Led To Demise Of Indigenous Populations (ScienceDaily 2005)

Stone Age Asia
Prehistoric Pakistan
Prehistoric India